Stia is a frazione of the  comune of Pratovecchio Stia in the Province of Arezzo in the Italian region Tuscany, located about  east of Florence and about  northwest of Arezzo. It was an independent commune until it was merged to Pratovecchio in 2014.

Geography
The town of Stia is often called the "source of the Arno", although the real source is some  higher on the slopes of Monte Falterona. However, Stia is the first true village the Arno reaches, where it is joined by another river, the Staggia, that starts at Passo la Calla to the north-east. It is suggested that the name 'Stia' comes from a corruption of the river Staggia's name. As well as the being situated on the confluence of the Arno and the Staggia, Stia also has its own spring that rises in the park of Palagio Fiorentino, which has now been channelled so the water flows from 10 permanent taps.

Stia borders the following municipalities: Londa, Pratovecchio, San Godenzo and Santa Sofia. It contus the hamlets (frazioni) of Molin di Bucchio, Palazzo, Papiano, Papiano Alto, Porciano, Santa Maria alle Grazie and Vallucciole.

Please note Stia has its origins from Dante Inferno.Nothing to do with the rivers.

Main sights

Stia grew up as the market place below the Guidi castle at Porciano. Presumably due to the topography, the piazza is not a normal square, but a more unusual triangular shape, sloping steeply at its far end. Today called Piazza Tanucci, after the Bernardo Tanucci, an Italian statesman, who was born in Stia in 1698.

Stia boasts a pair of covered arcades that run along either side of the piazza, today housing a variety of shops, bars and restaurants. On entering the piazza from the lower end, the baroque facade of Santa Maria della Assunta dominates the left-hand side of the street. The plain, 19th-century facade belies the fact that inside is a well-preserved Romanesque interior that is at least six hundred years older.

The original church was built around 1150 for the Guidi Counts at Porciano, although a sacred site here was documented even earlier in 1017. The original facade was demolished in 1776, when the piazza was enlarged, and was rebuilt in the present Baroque style.

Inside the sandstone columns are topped with capitals decorated with flora, animals and stylized people. The church also contains a glazed blue-and-white terracotta Madonna and Child; an example of the artist Andrea della Robbia's work.

The campanile at the rear of the church has been altered several times over its history, with the current belfry and clock added in the eighteenth century.

Historically the Casentino was a fertile valley with various industries helping make the area prosper. Timber was important during the Medici period for shipbuilding, as was the woolen fabric, produced first to clothe the monks and nuns in the area, and then the wealthy families of Tuscany. 'Panno Casentino' was originally made with yarn spun by local women at home, and later was produced in "modern cloth mills which line the Staggia" (Ella Noyes, 1905). At its height, the largest wool mill in Stia, built in 1838,  employed over 500 people, and produced 700,000 metres of cloth a year.

The factory is now a museum of wool production.

Bernardo Tanucci, an important 18th Century Italian statesman, was born at Stia in 1698.

Transport
Stia is home to a terminal railway station on the line that runs down the valley, following the Arno, to Arezzo. The line is owned by the company LFI.

References

Sources
Eckenstein, Lina. Through the Casentino with Hints for the Traveller (London, J.M.Dent & Co., 1902).
Jepson, Tim; Buckley, Johnathan; Ellingham, Mark. Tuscany & Umbria (London, Rough Guides, 2003).
Kleinhenz, Christopher (ed). Medieval Italy: An Encyclopedia (New York, Routledge, 2004).
Machiavelli, Niccolò. The History of Florence (A New Translation. London, Henry Bohn, 1847).
Noyes, Ella. The Casentino and its Story (London, J.M.Dent & Co, 1905).
Ring, Trudy; Sulkin, Robert; La Boda, Sharon (eds). International Dictionary of Historic Places: Southern Europe, Vol 3 (New York, Routledge, 1996).
Trollope, T. Adolophus. A History of the Commonwealth of Florence (London, Chapman and Hall, 1865).
Wickham, C.J. The Mountain and the City: The Tuscan Appennines in the Early Middle Age (Oxford, Clarendon Press, 1988).
Williams, H.W. Travels in Italy, Greece, and the Ionian Islands (Edinburgh, Archibald Constable & Co., 1820).

External links
 
Small towns in Italy
History of the Casentino
Information on the Casentino Valley
 

Cities and towns in Tuscany